Tortured Soul is a 1919 Italian silent film.

Tortured Soul may also refer to:

Tortured Soul (band), jazz fusion band from New York